The Rally for an Alternative of Harmonious and Integrated Development (RADHI) is a political party in the Comoros.

History
In the 2015 parliamentary elections RADHI won one of the 24 directly-elected seats, with Ahamada Baco elected in Mitsamiouli–Mboude.

References

Political parties in the Comoros